Cella is the inner chamber in a temple.

Cella may also refer to:

People 
 Cella (surname)
 Cella Delavrancea (1887–1991), Romanian pianist, writer, and teacher of piano
 Cella Serghi (1907–1992), Romanian prose writer

Places

Burkina Faso 
 Cella, Burkina Faso
 Cella De Loanga, Burkina Faso

Italy 
 Cella Dati, Italy
 Cella Monte, Italy

Other places 
 Cella, Aragon, Spain
 Cella, the Hungarian name for Ţela village, Bata Commune, Arad County, Romania

Other uses 
 Cella's, a brand of chocolate-covered cherries

See also 
 Cela (disambiguation)
 Sella (disambiguation)